Lavalle Department is a  department located in the northeast of Mendoza Province in Argentina.

Districts

Costa de Araujo
El Carmen
El Chilcal
El Plumero
El Vergel
Gustavo André
Jocolí
Jocolí Viejo
La Asunción
La Holanda
La Palmera
La Pega
Las Violetas
Lagunas del Rosario
Paramillo
San Francisco
San José
San Miguel
Tres de Mayo

External links
Tourist Guide (Spanish)

1853 establishments in Argentina
Departments of Mendoza Province